Queen Elizabeth Dock may refer to:
Queen Elizabeth II Dock, Mersey, UK
Queen Elizabeth Dock, Hull, UK